The Honourable Fanny Mary Katherine Bulkeley-Owen (1845 – 25 November 1927; née Ormsby-Gore, married name Kenyon from 1863, then Bulkeley-Owen from 1880) was a British historian and author. She was a member of the Anglo-Irish Gore family.

Biography
Ormsby-Gore was the only daughter of John Ormsby-Gore, 1st Baron Harlech. She married first, in 1863, Hon. Lloyd Kenyon (1835–1865), son and heir of the 3rd Baron Kenyon. He died before his father, and their only child, also named Lloyd Kenyon, succeeded his grandfather as 4th Baron Kenyon in 1869. She re-married, in 1880, Rev. Thomas Bulkeley-Owen, who died in 1910.

She displayed a keen interest in researching Welsh cultural movements, and wrote a memorandum on the history of Maelor Saesneg for the Welsh Land Commission in 1894. She was awarded the bardic title of Gwenrhian Gwynedd.

In 1897,  Bulkeley-Owen published a history of the parish of Selattyn, which includes the family estate of Brogyntyn. She died in Shrewsbury in 1927.

The National Library of Wales is in possession of a letter written by Lord Harlech to her, dated 9 December 1906.

References

1845 births
1927 deaths
19th-century Anglo-Irish people
20th-century Anglo-Irish people
19th-century British historians
19th-century British women writers
19th-century British writers
20th-century British women writers
Writers from Shropshire
Historians of Wales
British women historians
Daughters of barons
Gore family (Anglo-Irish aristocracy)